Oliver Gledhill (born 1966) is an English cellist. 

Oliver is Professor of Cello at Junior Guildhall and also teaches at Mill Hill School. He was a Scholar at the Guildhall School of Music and won numerous awards including the ISTEL/Redditch Music Society Competition. He studied with many eminent cellists including William Pleeth, Edmund Kurtz and André Navarra.

He has given acclaimed recitals at the Wigmore Hall and Purcell Room, including three in the Kirckman Concert Society Series. Festival appearances have included solo performances in England, France, Italy, Mallorca and the Czech Republic. Oliver has recorded eight CDs, including the complete works by Leon Boellmann, which was awarded five stars for performance by BBC Music Magazine, and has been played on ABC Classic FM (Australian Radio) and RTBF musiq3 (Belgian Radio).

Oliver Gledhill has recently (2013) completed a PhD at the Royal Academy of Music on cellist-composer WH Squire (1871–1963), his cello miniatures and the use of portamento. On Sunday 20 January 2013 Oliver Gledhill accompanied by Tadashi Imai on piano gave a concert "The best of WH Squire for cello" at Duke’s Hall, Royal Academy of Music to mark the 50th anniversary of the death of WH Squire. The cello miniatures were presented with descriptions and illustrations in the context of the life and work of WH Squire.

Recordings include:
 Cello Serenade
 Paul Müller-Zürich
 The Eye of the Storm
 Philipp Christoph Kayser
 French Romanticism I - Léon Boëllmann

External links
Guild Music Page 
Bio on Guildhall School page 

1966 births
Living people
English cellists